Ahmet Arslaner (born 24 December 1970) is a Turkish football manager and former player who played as a defender.

Honours
Kocaelispor
 Turkish Cup: 2001–02

References

Living people
1970 births
People from Üsküdar
Turkish footballers
Footballers from Istanbul
Association football defenders
Zeytinburnuspor footballers
Vanspor footballers
Kocaelispor footballers
Mersin İdman Yurdu footballers
Elazığspor footballers
Turanspor footballers
Turkish football managers
Kocaelispor managers